Syahrian Abimanyu (born 25 April 1999) is an Indonesian professional footballer who plays as a midfielder for Liga 1 club Persija Jakarta and the Indonesia national team.

Club career

Early career 
Abimanyu started his football career with SSB Jaya Mandiri Bogor soccer school. In 2016, he was sent to Levante in Spain to train with its youth squads.

Sriwijaya FC 
In 2017, Sriwijaya recruited Abimanyu for the 2018 Liga 1 (Indonesia) competition but failed to prevent the club from avoiding relegation.

Madura United
Nonetheless, Madura United signed him to play in the 2019 Liga 1 season. Abimanyu developed into a midfielder with playmaking abilities and precise crosses, winning him attention from Indonesia national under-23 football team coach Indra Sjafri who was preparing a squad for the 2019 Southeast Asian Games in the Philippines. This team went all the way to the final, with Abimanyu at the center of the midfield, before losing to Vietnam.

Johor Darul Ta'zim F.C.
Abimanyu found limited time to play and develop his skills in 2020 after the 2020 Liga 1 season was canceled after three matches due to the COVID-19 pandemic. In December 2020, Malaysian Super League giant Johor Darul Ta'zim F.C. announced it has signed him on a long-term contract with a possibility of loaning him in his first year.

Newcastle Jets (loan)
On 5 February 2021, Johor Darul Ta'zim announced that Abimanyu has been loaned to top-flight Australian club Newcastle Jets for the remainder of the 2020-21 A-League season. On 5 April 2021, Abimanyu made his A-League debut as a 89th-minute substitute for Matthew Millar in a 0-1 defeat to Western United FC On 2 June 2021, his parent club Johor Darul Ta'zim announced his return for the remaining of the 2021 season following the end of a short-term loan stint with Newcastle Jets.

Return to Johor Darul Ta'zim
After finishing his loan spell at Australia, Syahrian starts to training with the first team but his suffered light injury but he managed to recovered. On 8 August, Syahrian makes his debut in Malaysia Super League on 76th minute replacing Malaysia veteran Safiq Rahim.

Persija Jakarta 
On 12 January 2022, Johor Darul Ta'zim and Persija Jakarta has agreed to an undisclosed fee to sign Abimanyu on a two-year contract until 2024. He made his league debut on 5 February 2022 in a match against Arema at the Kapten I Wayan Dipta Stadium, Gianyar. On 10 March 2022, Abimanyu scored his first league goal for Persija in a 1–2 lose over Borneo Samarinda at the Kapten I Wayan Dipta Stadium.

International career
In 2018, Abimanyu represented the Indonesia U-19, in the 2018 AFC U-19 Championship. He also played for the Indonesia team that won silver in the 2019 Southeast Asian Games. He received a call to join the senior Indonesian national football team in May 2021. He earned his first senior cap in a 25 May 2021 friendly match in Dubai against Afghanistan.

On 26 December 2022, Abimanyu scored his first goal for the national team, against Brunei at the 2022 AFF Championship tournament.

Career statistics

Club

International

International goals

Honours

Club 
Sriwijaya
 President's Cup third place: 2018
 East Kalimantan Governor Cup: 2018

Johor Darul Ta'zim
 Malaysia Super League: 2021

International 
Indonesia U-16
 AFF U-16 Youth Championship runner-up: 2013
Indonesia U-19
 AFF U-19 Youth Championship third place: 2017, 2018
Indonesia U-23
 Southeast Asian Games  Silver medal: 2019
 Southeast Asian Games  Bronze medal: 2021
Indonesia
 AFF Championship runner-up: 2020

References

External links 
 Syahrian Abimanyu at Liga Indonesia
 

Living people
1998 births
Sportspeople from Central Java
Association football midfielders
Indonesian footballers
Sriwijaya F.C. players
Madura United F.C. players
Johor Darul Ta'zim F.C. players
Newcastle Jets FC players
Persija Jakarta players
Liga 1 (Indonesia) players
A-League Men players
Malaysia Super League players
Indonesian expatriate footballers
Expatriate soccer players in Australia
Indonesian expatriate sportspeople in Australia
Expatriate footballers in Malaysia
Indonesian expatriate sportspeople in Malaysia
Indonesia youth international footballers
Indonesia international footballers
Competitors at the 2019 Southeast Asian Games
Southeast Asian Games silver medalists for Indonesia
Southeast Asian Games medalists in football
Competitors at the 2021 Southeast Asian Games
21st-century Indonesian people